The office of Vice-President of the Board of Trade is a junior ministerial position in the government of the United Kingdom at the Board of Trade. The office was created in 1786 but fell into abeyance in 1867. From 1848 onwards, the office was held concurrently with that of Paymaster-General. The office of Vice-President itself was effectively succeeded by that of Parliamentary Secretary to the Board of Trade but the role is extant.

Notable holders of the office of Vice-President include Lord Grenville, William Gladstone, Lord Goderich and the Earl Granville.

In 2020, there was an unusual appointment of a Deputy President of the Board of Trade to assist the President, but the holder remained only an adviser to the Board. This appears to have been a one-off appointment, and this role no longer exists.

Vice-Presidents of the Board of Trade, 1786–1867 (currently in abeyance)

Deputy President of the Board of Trade, 2020
As some point on or before 8 June 2020, when it was mentioned in answer to a written parliamentary question, the Board of Trade had begun to be served by a Deputy President, in the person of the backbencher Marcus Fysh MP. This was later mentioned in a press release about updated membership.

References

Trade, Vice-President of the Board of